Protorhabditis is a genus of nematodes in the family Rhabditidae.

Phylogenetic studies 
The analysis of sequences of three nuclear genes shows that the Protorhabditis, Diploscapter and Prodontorhabditis genera group together to form the 'Protorhabditis' group, the sister group of the Caenorhabditis species, all included in the 'Eurhabditis' group of Rhabditidae genera.

References 

 

Rhabditidae
Secernentea genera